Nikola Milošević (Serbian Cyrillic: Никола Милошевић; born 8 June 1993) is a Serbian football midfielder.

Career
He made his debut for FK Napredak Kruševac on 13 March 2010 in a Serbian Superliga match versus Red Star Belgrade.

Career statistics

Honours
Napredak Kruševac
Serbian First League: 2012–13

References

External links
 Profile on Official website
 
 Stats at Prva liga Srbije

1993 births
Living people
Sportspeople from Kruševac
Serbian footballers
Association football midfielders
FK Napredak Kruševac players
FK Sloboda Užice players
FK Mladost Lučani players
Serbian SuperLiga players
FK Temnić players